Schiebel Corporation is an Austrian company that manufactures mine detectors and helicopter UAVs. It is based in Vienna. 

The company was founded in 1951 as a manufacturer of small electronic components, for example for washing machines, and started with the engineering of mine detectors in the mid 1980s. Since the mid 1990s, the company is also engaged in constructing UAVs. 

The company has its factory in Wiener Neustadt.

Products
 Camcopter S-100

External links
 http://www.schiebel.net/

Manufacturing companies based in Vienna
Austrian brands